This glossary of board games explains commonly used terms in board games, in alphabetical order. For a list of board games, see List of board games; for terms specific to chess, see Glossary of chess; for terms specific to chess problems, see Glossary of chess problems.

A

B

C

D

E

F

G

H

I

J

L

M

O

P

R

S

T

W

Notes

References

External links
 Glossary at BoardGameGeek

Board games
Board Games
Wikipedia glossaries using description lists